Aleksandr Alekseevich Borovkov (Александр Алексеевич Боровков; born 6 March 1931, in Moscow) is a Russian mathematician.

Borovkov received his Russian candidate degree (Ph.D.) in 1959 under Andrey Kolmogorov at Moscow State University and his Russian doctorate (higher doctoral degree) in 1963. He is an academician at the Sobolev Institute of Mathematics of the Siberian Branch of the Russian Academy of Sciences and a professor at the Novosibirsk State University.

His research deals with probability theory, mathematical statistics, and stochastic processes.

He was an Invited Speaker of the ICM in 1966 in Moscow and in 1978 in Helsinki (Rate of convergence and large deviations in invariance principle).

He was elected in 1966 a corresponding member and in 1990 a full member of the Russian Academy of Sciences. In 1979 he received the USSR State Prize.

Selected publications
Stochastic processes in queueing theory. Springer, 1976
Asymptotic methods in queuing theory. Wiley, 1984. 
Probability Theory. New York: Gordon & Breach, 1998
Mathematical Statistics. New York: Gordon & Breach, 1998
Ergodicity and stability of stochastic processes. New York: Wiley, 1998.
with A. A. Mogulskii:  Large deviations and testing statistical hypothesis, Siber. Adv. Math., 1992, 1993
with Konstantin A. Borovkov: Asymptotic analysis of random walks. Series: Encyclopedia of Mathematics and Its Applications, Vol. 118. Cambridge University Press, 2008.

References

External links
mathnet.ru

1931 births
Living people
20th-century Russian mathematicians
21st-century Russian mathematicians
Recipients of the USSR State Prize
Moscow State University alumni
Academic staff of Novosibirsk State University
Full Members of the Russian Academy of Sciences